Sasina may refer to:

 Sasina, Samoa, a village in Samoa
 Sasina (Sanski Most), a village in Bosnia